Workforce management (WFM) is an institutional process that maximizes performance levels and competency for an organization. The process includes all the activities needed to maintain a productive workforce, such as field service management, human resource management, performance and training management, data collection, recruiting, budgeting, forecasting, scheduling and analytics.

Workforce management provides a common set of performance-based tools and software to support corporate management, front-line supervisors, store managers and workers across manufacturing, distribution, transportation, and retail operations. It is sometimes referred to as HRM systems, or Workforce asset management, or part of ERP systems.

Definition 

As workforce management has developed from a traditional approach of staff scheduling to improve time management, it has become more integrated and demand-oriented to optimize the scheduling of staff. Besides the two core aspects of demand-orientation and optimization, workforce management may also incorporate:
forecasting of workload and required staff
involvement of employees into the scheduling process
management of working times and accounts
analysis and monitoring of the entire process.

The starting point is a clear definition of the work required through engineered standards and optimal methods for performing each task as efficiently and safely as possible. Based on this foundation and demand-based forecasts, workers are scheduled, tasks are assigned, performance is measured, feedback is provided and incentives are computed and paid. In addition, online training is provided along with supervisor-based coaching to bring all workers up to required levels of proficiency. Workforce management is a complete approach designed to make workforce as productive as possible, reduce labor costs, and improve customer service.

Field service management
Workforce management also uses the process of field service management in order to have oversight of company's resources not used on company property. Examples include:
Demand management  – to help forecast work orders to plan the number and expertise of staff that will be needed
Workforce scheduler  – using predefined rules to automatically optimise the schedule and use of resources (people, parts, vehicles)
Workforce dispatcher – automatically assigning work orders within predefined zones to particular technicians
Mobile solutions – allowing dispatchers and technicians to communicate in real time.

Market growth
In the 1980s and 1990s, entrepreneurs focused on topics such as supply chain management, production planning systems or enterprise resource planning. As cost pressures have increased, managers have turned their attention to human resources issues. In all personnel-intensive industries, workforce management has become an important strategic element in corporate management. The process has experienced growth in all sectors, including healthcare. The rise of the gig economy has also gone hand in hand with the rise of workforce management preactices.

Mobile workforce management

As our society continues to adopt new technologies such as smartphones and enterprise mobility tools, more companies are allowing employees to become mobile. Mobile workforce management refers to activities used to schedule the employees working outside the company premises. It helps distribute workforce efficiently across various departments in an institution. The need for social distancing imposed by the COVID-19 pandemic has brought about major changes in both employer's and employee's vision of remote work, which will likely have a long-lasting impact on workforce organization and management in the coming years.

Software
Workforce management solutions can be deployed enterprise-wide and through mobile platforms. While special software is commonly used in numerous areas such as ERP (enterprise resource planning), SLM (service lifecycle management), CRM (customer relationship management) and HR (human resources) management, the management of the workforce is often still handled using spreadsheet programs or time recording. This often results in expensive overtime, non-productive idle times, high fluctuation rates, poor customer service and opportunity costs being incurred. By using a software solution for demand-oriented workforce management, planners can optimize staffing by creating schedules that at all times conform to the forecasted requirements. At the same time, a workforce management solution helps users to observe all relevant legislations, local agreements and the contracts of individual employees – including work-life balance guidelines.

A key aspect of workforce management is scheduling. This is achieved by establishing likely demand by analyzing historical data (such as the number and duration of customer contacts, sales figures, check-out transactions or orders to be handled). Many workforce management systems also offer manual adjustment capabilities. The calculated forecast values are then converted into actual staffing requirements by means of an algorithm that is adjusted to the particular use case. The algorithm itself is based on the work of Erlang though most modern adaptations of workforce management have shifted towards a richer state management, and optimizations to the original idea.

Current and future staffing requirements, short-term peak loads, availabilities, holidays, budget allowances, skills, labour law-related restrictions, as well as wage and contractual terms have to be integrated into the planning process to guarantee optimal staff deployment. In the workforce management process, the integration of employees is an important factor. In several workforce management systems, employees can log in their availability or planned absences and they can bid for specific shifts so long as they have the necessary skills for the activities planned for these shifts.

Delivery
The three methods of delivery for contact center technologies are on-premises solution, hosted or cloud-based computing.

An on-premises system is one in which hardware and software must be physically installed, deployed and maintained at the business. All equipment is purchased up front. It is traditionally associated with large enterprises with the budget and the space to acquire the capabilities deemed necessary, and the personnel available to configure and modify systems.
A hosted system relies on an outside service provider. Software is purchased and installed in a data center on either physical or virtual servers that may be owned or leased by the business. Implementation is similar to an on-premises solution, but the cost is typically lower because hardware need not be purchased. However, the business must pay an initial provisioning fee as well as a monthly fee for the rental or usage of the hosting center’s equipment and personnel.
Cloud computing converts such physical resources as processors and storage into Internet resources. By developing applications in a virtual environment, a company’s computing infrastructure is treated as a utility service, and the company pays only for the time and capacity it needs. Cloud eliminates issues such as computing capacity, physical space, bandwidth and storage.

See also 
Medical outsourcing
Meeting scheduling tool
Project workforce management
Project management
Strategic service management
Time and attendance
Time tracking software
Workforce optimization
Employee Scheduling Software
Timesheet

Notes
 AMR Research, 2006: The Human Capital Management Applications Report, 2005–2010
 DMG Consulting: 2009 Contact Centre Workforce Management Market Report
 Workforce Asset Management Book of Knowledge (John Wiley & Sons Publishing, 2013)
 Portage Communications, LLC:

References 

Business software
Human resource management